CD4 immunoadhesin is a recombinant fusion protein consisting of a combination of CD4 and the fragment crystallizable region. It belongs to the antibody (Ig) gene family. CD4 is a surface receptor for human immunodeficiency virus (HIV). The properties of the protein means that it has potential to be used in AIDS therapy . One of the most relevant of these possibilities is its ability to cross the placenta.

External links

 
 

Engineered proteins